Christopher Benson may refer to:
 Christopher Benson (theologian) (1788–1868), English preacher and lecturer
 Christopher Benson (company director) (born 1933), British chartered surveyor and company director